The Exhibition Place Carillon (originally the Carlsberg Carillon) is a carillon located at Exhibition Place in Toronto, Ontario, Canada.

History
In 1974, Carling-O'Keefe Breweries provided funding for the construction of the 50-bell carillon. The bells were cast by the Royal Eijsbouts foundry of Asten in the Netherlands. The largest bell (the bourdon) weighs 4800 pounds. The instrument transposes up a perfect fourth from concert pitch. Four of the large bells including the bourdon are equipped with outside hammers to sound the Cambridge Quarters while the bourdon strikes the hour. Part way up the tower is a compartment with figures of the Hans Christian Andersen fairy tale "The Swineherd"; upon activation, these figures could be moved from one side of the tower to the other, but the mechanism is no longer functional. When the carillon was built, it was played most days of the week during the Exhibition summer season. The current carillonist is Gerald Martindale.

The original plaque reads:

See also
 List of carillons

References

External links
Description of the Exhibition Place Carillon at towerbells.org
Description of the "Bandshell Park Clock" above the carillon at waymarking.com

Bell towers in Canada
Buildings and structures in Toronto
Carillons
Carlsberg Group
Exhibition Place
Towers completed in 1974